The 2017–18 European Rugby Champions Cup pool stage is the first stage of the 23rd season of European club rugby union, and the fourth under the European Rugby Champions Cup format.

The competition involves twenty teams, across five pools of four teams, for eight quarter-final places – awarded to the five pool winners and the three top-ranked pool runners-up.

The pool stage began on the weekend of 13–15 October 2017, and ended following round 6, on the weekend of 19–21 January 2018.

Seeding
The 20 competing teams are seeded and split into four tiers, each containing five teams.

For the purpose of creating the tiers, clubs are ranked based on their domestic league performances and on their qualification for the knockout phases of their championships, so a losing quarter-finalist in the Top 14 would be seeded below a losing semi-finalist, even if they finished above them in the regular season.

Based on these seedings, teams are placed into one of the four tiers, with the top seed clubs being put in Tier 1. The nature of the tier system means that a draw is needed to allocate two of the three second seed clubs to Tier 1. The tiers are shown below. Brackets show each team's seeding and their league (for example, 1 Top 14 indicates the team was seeded 1st from the Top 14).

The following restrictions will apply to the draw:
 Each pool will consist of four clubs, one from each tier in the draw.
 Each pool must have one from each league drawn from Tier 1, 2 or 3. No pool will have a second team from the same league until the allocation of Tier 4 takes place.
 Where two PRO12 clubs compete in the same pool, they must be from different countries.

Pool stage

The draw took place on 8 June 2017, in Neuchâtel, Switzerland.	

Teams in the same pool play each other twice, at home and away, in the group stage that begins on the weekend of 13/14/15 October 2017, and continues through to 19/20/21 January 2018. The five pool winners and three best runners-up progress to the quarter-finals.

Teams are awarded group points based on match performances. Four points are awarded for a win, two points for a draw, one attacking bonus point for scoring four or more tries in a match and one defensive bonus point for losing a match by seven points or fewer.

In the event of a tie between two or more teams, the following tie-breakers will be used, as directed by EPCR:
 Where teams have played each other
 The club with the greater number of competition points from only matches involving tied teams.
 If equal, the club with the best aggregate points difference from those matches.
 If equal, the club that scored the most tries in those matches.
 Where teams remain tied and/or have not played each other in the competition (i.e. are from different pools)
 The club with the best aggregate points difference from the pool stage.
 If equal, the club that scored the most tries in the pool stage.
 If equal, the club with the fewest players suspended in the pool stage.
 If equal, the drawing of lots will determine a club's ranking.

(Q) denotes the team has qualified for the quarter-finals as the pool winners
(q) denotes team has at least qualified for the quarter-finals as one of the three highest-scoring second-place teams

Pool 1

Pool 2

Pool 3

Pool 4

Pool 5

References

2017–18 European Rugby Champions Cup
2017–18